Franz Langthaler (born 10 November 1964) is an Austrian weightlifter. He competed at the 1984 Summer Olympics and the 1988 Summer Olympics.

References

External links
 

1964 births
Living people
Austrian male weightlifters
Olympic weightlifters of Austria
Weightlifters at the 1984 Summer Olympics
Weightlifters at the 1988 Summer Olympics
Sportspeople from Vienna
20th-century Austrian people